Advanced Placement (AP) Physics B was an Advanced Placement Physics course equivalent to a year-long introductory college course in basic physics concepts. High school students studied Newtonian mechanics, electromagnetism, fluid mechanics, thermal physics, waves, optics, atomic and nuclear physics in preparation for a cumulative exam given each May. The course was algebra-based and involved algebra and trigonometry to solve various physics problems. This course also helped prepare students for the SAT Subject Test in Physics, also administered by the College Board. The last AP Physics B examination was administered in May 2014. The College Board discontinued AP Physics B, replacing it with AP Physics 1 and AP Physics 2, in the 2014–2015 school year.

Exam

The exam consisted of a 70 MCQ section, followed by a 6-7 FRQ section. Each section was 90 minutes and was worth 50% of the final score. The MCQ section banned calculators, while the FRQ allowed calculators and a list of common formulas. Overall, the exam was configured to approximately cover a set percentage of each of the five target categories:

Purpose

According to the College Board web site, the Physics B course provided "a foundation in physics for students in the life sciences, a pre medical career path, and some applied sciences, as well as other fields not directly related to science."

Discontinuation
Starting in the 2014–2015 school year, AP Physics B was no longer offered, and AP Physics 1 and AP Physics 2 took its place. Like AP Physics B, both are algebra-based, and both are designed to be taught as year-long courses.

Grade distribution
The grade distributions for the Physics B scores from 2010 until its discontinuation in 2014 are as follows:

References

External links
College Board Course Description: Physics

Advanced Placement
Physics education
Standardized tests